Ivanna Borovychenko (born 7 July 1990) is a Ukrainian racing cyclist. She competed in the 2012 UCI women's road race in Valkenburg aan de Geul and in the 2013 UCI women's road race in Florence.

References

External links

1990 births
Living people
Ukrainian female cyclists
Place of birth missing (living people)